These 487 species belong to Maladera, a genus of May beetles and junebugs in the family Scarabaeidae.

Maladera species

 Maladera affinis (Blanchard, 1850) c g
 Maladera ahrensi Keith, 2005 c g
 Maladera alibagensis Ahrens & Fabrizi, 2016 c g
 Maladera allemandi Keith, 1998 c g
 Maladera allolaterita Ahrens & Fabrizi, 2016 c g
 Maladera allopruinosa (Ahrens, 1998) c g
 Maladera amamiana Nomura, 1959 c g
 Maladera amboliensis Ahrens & Fabrizi, 2016 c g
 Maladera anaimalaiensis Ahrens & Fabrizi, 2016 c g
 Maladera analis (Brenske, 1899) c g
 Maladera andamana (Brenske, 1898) c
 Maladera anderssoni Fabrizi & Ahrens, 2014 c g
 Maladera andrewesi Ahrens & Fabrizi, 2016 c g
 Maladera angusta Baraud, 1990 c g
 Maladera antispinosa Ahrens & Fabrizi, 2016 c g
 Maladera apfelbecki (Petrovitz, 1969) c g
 Maladera arenicola (Solsky, 1876) c g
 Maladera armeniaca Reitter, 1896 c g
 Maladera armipes (Arrow, 1945) c g
 Maladera assamica (Moser, 1915) c g
 Maladera atavana (Brenske, 1899) c g
 Maladera attaliensis (Petrovitz, 1969) c g
 Maladera aureola (Murayama, 1938) c g
 Maladera avicula (Arrow, 1946) c g
 Maladera badullana Fabrizi & Ahrens, 2014 c g
 Maladera bagmatiensis Ahrens, 2004 c g
 Maladera bakeri (Moser, 1915) c
 Maladera ballariensis Ahrens & Fabrizi, 2016 c g
 Maladera balphakramensis Ahrens & Fabrizi, 2016 c g
 Maladera baluchestanica Petrovitz, 1971 c g
 Maladera bandarwelana Fabrizi & Ahrens, 2014 c g
 Maladera bangaloreensis Ahrens & Fabrizi, 2016 c g
 Maladera basalis (Moser, 1915) c
 Maladera beata (Brenske, 1902) c g
 Maladera bengalensis (Brenske, 1898) c
 Maladera besucheti Baraud, 1990 c g
 Maladera bhutanensis (Frey, 1975) c g
 Maladera bilobata (Arrow, 1945) c
 Maladera bismarckiana (Brenske, 1898) c g
 Maladera bisornata Fabrizi & Ahrens, 2014 c g
 Maladera boettcheri (Moser, 1926) c
 Maladera bombycina (Karsch, 1882) c g
 Maladera bombycinoides Ahrens & Fabrizi, 2016 c g
 Maladera botrytibia Nomura, 1974 c g
 Maladera breviata (Brenske, 1898) c g
 Maladera breviatella Fabrizi & Ahrens, 2014 c g
 Maladera brevis (Blanchard, 1850) c
 Maladera brevistylis Ahrens, 2004 c g
 Maladera brincki Fabrizi & Ahrens, 2014 c g
 Maladera bruschii Sabatinelli, 1977 c g
 Maladera burmeisteri (Brenske, 1898) c
 Maladera caifensis (Brenske, 1897) c g
 Maladera calcarata (Brenske, 1898) c g
 Maladera calicutensis (Frey, 1972) c g
 Maladera cardamomensis Ahrens & Fabrizi, 2016 c g
 Maladera cardoni (Brenske, 1896) c
 Maladera cariniceps (Moser, 1915) c g
 Maladera carinifrons (Brenske, 1896) c g
 Maladera caspia (Faldermann, 1836) c g
 Maladera castanea (Arrow, 1913) i c g b  (Asiatic garden beetle)
 Maladera celebensis (Moser, 1915) c
 Maladera cerrutii Sabatinelli, 1977 c g
 Maladera chiruwae Ahrens, 2004 c g
 Maladera cinnaberina (Brenske, 1898) c g
 Maladera clavata (Frey, 1972) c g
 Maladera clypeata (Fairmaire, 1887) c g
 Maladera cobosi Baraud, 1964 c g
 Maladera coimbatoreensis Ahrens & Fabrizi, 2016 c g
 Maladera comosa (Brenske, 1898) c g
 Maladera conspicua Ahrens, 2004 c g
 Maladera constans Ahrens & Fabrizi, 2016 c g
 Maladera consularis Ahrens & Fabrizi, 2009 c g
 Maladera contracta (Brenske, 1898) c g
 Maladera costigera (Blanchard, 1850) c g
 Maladera coxalis (Moser, 1915) c g
 Maladera crinifrons (Brenske, 1899) c g
 Maladera cruralis (Frey, 1972) c g
 Maladera curtipes (Moser, 1915) c g
 Maladera dahanshana Kobayashi, 2016 c g
 Maladera davaoana (Moser, 1921) c g
 Maladera davidis (Brenske, 1898) c g
 Maladera declarata Ahrens & Fabrizi, 2016 c g
 Maladera decolor Ahrens & Fabrizi, 2016 c g
 Maladera delicta (Brenske, 1897) c g
 Maladera densipilosa Ahrens & Fabrizi, 2016 c g
 Maladera dentipenis Sehnal & Simandl, 2008 c g
 Maladera detersa (Erichson, 1834) c g
 Maladera dierli (Frey, 1969) c
 Maladera dimidiata Ahrens & Fabrizi, 2016 c g
 Maladera distincta (Moser, 1915) c
 Maladera diyalumana Fabrizi & Ahrens, 2014 c g
 Maladera drescheri (Moser, 1913) c
 Maladera dubia (Arrow, 1916) c g
 Maladera dunhindaensis Ahrens & Fabrizi, 2016 c g
 Maladera duvivieri (Brenske, 1896) c g
 Maladera eclogaria (Brenske, 1899) c g
 Maladera egregia (Arrow, 1946) c g
 Maladera ejimai Miyake & Imasaka, 1987 c g
 Maladera ekisi Fabrizi & Ahrens, 2014 c g
 Maladera eluctabilis (Brenske, 1899) c g
 Maladera emmrichi Ahrens, 2004 c g
 Maladera engana (Brenske, 1902) c g
 Maladera eremita (Brenske, 1899) c
 Maladera espagnoli Baraud, 1964 c g
 Maladera euphorbiae (Burmeister, 1855) c g
 Maladera eusericina Ahrens & Fabrizi, 2016 c g
 Maladera excisiceps (Reitter, 1896) c g
 Maladera exigua (Brenske, 1894) c
 Maladera faceta Ahrens & Fabrizi, 2016 c g
 Maladera farsensis Petrovitz, 1980 c g
 Maladera fasciculata (Moser, 1922) c g
 Maladera fastuosa Ahrens & Fabrizi, 2016 c g
 Maladera fatigata Ahrens, 2004 c g
 Maladera femorata (Brenske, 1899) c g
 Maladera ferekanarana Ahrens & Fabrizi, 2016 c g
 Maladera ferruginea (Kollar & Redtenbacher, 1849) c g
 Maladera festina (Brenske, 1898) c g
 Maladera fistulosa (Brenske, 1898) c g
 Maladera flammea (Brenske, 1898) c g
 Maladera flinti Fabrizi & Ahrens, 2014 c g
 Maladera floresina (Brenske, 1899) c g
 Maladera formosae (Brenske, 1898) c g
 Maladera freyi Ahrens & Fabrizi, 2016 c g
 Maladera frischi Keith, 2011 c g
 Maladera fulgida (Brenske, 1898) c g
 Maladera fuliginosa (Burmeister, 1855) c g
 Maladera fumosa (Brenske, 1898) c g
 Maladera furcillata (Brenske, 1897) c g
 Maladera fusca (Frey, 1972) c
 Maladera fuscescens (Moser, 1917) c
 Maladera fusconitens (Fairmaire, 1892) c g
 Maladera futschauana (Brenske, 1897) c g
 Maladera ganglbaueri (Brenske, 1899) c g
 Maladera gardneri Ahrens, 2004 c g
 Maladera garoana Ahrens & Fabrizi, 2016 c g
 Maladera geniculata Ahrens & Fabrizi, 2016 c g
 Maladera gibbiventris (Brenske, 1897) c g
 Maladera girardi Keith & Ahrens, 2002 c g
 Maladera globosa (Frey, 1972) c g
 Maladera golovjankoi Medvedev, 1952 c g
 Maladera gopaldharae Ahrens, 2004 c g
 Maladera gorkhae Ahrens, 2004 c g
 Maladera graeca (Petrovitz, 1969) c g
 Maladera granigera Ahrens & Fabrizi, 2016 c g
 Maladera granuligera (Blanchard, 1850) c g
 Maladera guttula (Sharp, 1876) c g
 Maladera haldwaniensis Ahrens, 2004 c g
 Maladera hampsoni Ahrens & Fabrizi, 2016 c g
 Maladera harmonica (Brenske, 1897) c g
 Maladera hastata Fabrizi & Ahrens, 2014 c g
 Maladera hauseri (Brenske, 1898) c
 Maladera hayashii Hirasawa, 1991 c g
 Maladera heveli Fabrizi & Ahrens, 2014 c g
 Maladera hiekei (Frey, 1972) c g
 Maladera hiemalis Kobayashi, 2014 c g
 Maladera himalayica (Brenske, 1896) c g
 Maladera hiranoi Miyake, 1986 c g
 Maladera hmong Ahrens, 2004 c g
 Maladera hodkovae Nikodym & Kral, 1998 c g
 Maladera holosericea (Scopoli, 1772) c g
 Maladera holzschuhi Ahrens, 2004 c g
 Maladera hongkongica (Brenske, 1898) c g
 Maladera horii (Kobayashi, 2010) c g
 Maladera hortonensis Fabrizi & Ahrens, 2014 c g
 Maladera howdeni Ahrens, 2003 c g
 Maladera hunliensis Ahrens & Fabrizi, 2016 c g
 Maladera ignava (Brenske, 1894) c g
 Maladera iliganica (Moser, 1917) c g
 Maladera imasakai Miyake & Yamaya, 1995 c g
 Maladera imbella Reitter, 1898 c g
 Maladera impressithorax Nomura, 1973 c g
 Maladera impubis Ahrens, 2004 c g
 Maladera inadai (Kobayashi, 2010) c g
 Maladera inaequabilis (Brenske, 1898) c g
 Maladera indica (Blanchard, 1850) c
 Maladera inermis (Brenske, 1898) c g
 Maladera infuscata (Moser, 1915) c g
 Maladera inimica (Brenske, 1898) c g
 Maladera initialis Ahrens & Fabrizi, 2016 c g
 Maladera inornata (Brenske, 1899) c g
 Maladera insanabilis (Brenske, 1894) c g
 Maladera insubida (Brenske, 1898) c g
 Maladera insularis (Brenske, 1898) c
 Maladera invenusta (Moser, 1918) c g
 Maladera iraqensis Keith, 2000 c g
 Maladera iridescens (Blanchard, 1850) c g
 Maladera iridicauda (Fairmaire, 1893) c g
 Maladera irididorsis Ahrens, 2004 c g
 Maladera isarogensis (Moser, 1922) c g
 Maladera iuga Fabrizi & Ahrens, 2014 c g
 Maladera jaintiaensis Ahrens & Fabrizi, 2016 c g
 Maladera japonica (Motschulsky, 1860) c g b
 Maladera jiraskovae Sehnal, 2008 c g
 Maladera joachimi Ahrens, 2004 c g
 Maladera johannesi Ahrens & Fabrizi, 2016 c g
 Maladera kallarensis Ahrens & Fabrizi, 2016 c g
 Maladera kamiyai (Sawada, 1937) c
 Maladera kanarana (Moser, 1918) c
 Maladera kandyensis Fabrizi & Ahrens, 2014 c g
 Maladera kasigurana (Moser, 1922) c g
 Maladera kawaharai (Kobayashi, 2010) c g
 Maladera kawaii (Kobayashi, 2010) c g
 Maladera kazirangae Ahrens, 2004 c g
 Maladera keralensis (Frey, 1972) c
 Maladera kerleyi Ahrens, 2004 c g
 Maladera kermanica Montreuil, 2016 c g
 Maladera khuzestanica Montreuil, 2016 c g
 Maladera kinabaluensis (Brenske, 1899) c
 Maladera kobayashii Nomura, 1974 c g
 Maladera kojimai Miyake, 1991 c g
 Maladera kostali Ahrens & Fabrizi, 2016 c g
 Maladera krali Ahrens, 2004 c g
 Maladera kreyenbergi (Moser, 1918) c g
 Maladera krombeini Fabrizi & Ahrens, 2014 c g
 Maladera krueperi (Petrovitz, 1969) c g
 Maladera kubotai Nomura & Kobayashi, 1979 c g
 Maladera kumei Kobayashi, 1990 c g
 Maladera kumilyensis Ahrens & Fabrizi, 2016 c g
 Maladera kunigami Kobayashi, Kusui & Imasaka, 2006 c g
 Maladera kuruwitana Fabrizi & Ahrens, 2014 c g
 Maladera kusuii Miyake, 1986 c g
 Maladera laminifera (Moser, 1916) c g
 Maladera lanae Kobayashi, 2012 c g
 Maladera lata (Brenske, 1902) c
 Maladera lateritia (Moser, 1915) c g
 Maladera leevis (Frey, 1972) c g
 Maladera lignicolor (Fairmaire, 1887) c g
 Maladera lindulana Fabrizi & Ahrens, 2014 c g
 Maladera liotibia Nomura, 1974 c g
 Maladera lishana Miyake, 1989 c g
 Maladera liukueiensis Kobayashi, 1985 g
 Maladera lodosi Baraud, 1975 c g
 Maladera loebli Baraud, 1990 c g
 Maladera lonaviaensis Ahrens & Fabrizi, 2016 c g
 Maladera longiclava (Moser, 1926) c g
 Maladera longipennis Verdu & Mico & Galante, 1997 c g
 Maladera lorenzi Ahrens & Fabrizi, 2016 c g
 Maladera ludipennis Miyake, Yamaguchi & Akiyama, 2002 c g
 Maladera lugubris (Brenske, 1896) c g
 Maladera lukjanovitschi (Medvedev, 1966) c g
 Maladera luteola (Moser, 1918) c g
 Maladera lyciensis (Petrovitz, 1969) c g
 Maladera madurensis (Moser, 1915) c
 Maladera maedai Nomura, 1974 c g
 Maladera magnicornis (Moser, 1920) c
 Maladera magnidentata Miyake & Yamaguchi, 1998 c g
 Maladera major (Arrow, 1946) c g
 Maladera malabarensis Ahrens & Fabrizi, 2016 c g
 Maladera malangeana (Brenske, 1902) c g
 Maladera malaya (Brenske, 1899) c g
 Maladera manipurana (Brenske, 1898) c g
 Maladera marginella (Hope, 1831) c g
 Maladera masumotoi Nomura, 1974 c g
 Maladera mavilluensis Fabrizi & Ahrens, 2014 c g
 Maladera maxima (Brenske, 1898) c g
 Maladera mechiana Ahrens, 2004 c g
 Maladera mekong Miyake & Yamaguchi, 1998 c g
 Maladera merkli Ahrens, 2004 c g
 Maladera miliouensis Keith & Miessen, 2009 c g
 Maladera minops Ahrens & Fabrizi, 2016 c g
 Maladera mirabilis (Brenske, 1894) c
 Maladera mirzayansi Montreuil & Keith, 2009 c g
 Maladera mjobergi (Moser, 1932) c g
 Maladera modesta (Fairmaire, 1881) c g
 Maladera modestula (Brenske, 1902) c g
 Maladera moebiusi (Brenske, 1898) c g
 Maladera mofidii Montreuil & Keith, 2009 c g
 Maladera mollis (Walker, 1859) c g
 Maladera moseri (Arrow, 1944) c g
 Maladera motschulskyi (Brenske, 1897) c g
 Maladera mulmeina (Brenske, 1898) c g
 Maladera murzini Ahrens, 2004 c g
 Maladera mussardi Ahrens & Fabrizi, 2016 c g
 Maladera mussooriensis Ahrens, 2004 c g
 Maladera mutabilis (Fabricius, 1775) c g
 Maladera mysoreensis Ahrens & Fabrizi, 2016 c g
 Maladera naduvatamensis Ahrens & Fabrizi, 2016 c g
 Maladera nagporeana (Brenske, 1898) c g
 Maladera nakamurai Miyake, 1991 c g
 Maladera namborensis Ahrens & Fabrizi, 2016 c g
 Maladera nanshanchiana Nomura, 1974 c g
 Maladera nasuta (Brenske, 1894) c g
 Maladera nasutella (Ahrens, 2004) c g
 Maladera neotridentipes Ahrens & Fabrizi, 2016 c g
 Maladera nigrolucida Ahrens & Fabrizi, 2016 c g
 Maladera nigromicans (Frey, 1973) c g
 Maladera nigrorubra (Brenske, 1894) c g
 Maladera nilaveliensis Fabrizi & Ahrens, 2014 c g
 Maladera nilgirina (Frey, 1972) c g
 Maladera nitidipes (Moser, 1915) c g
 Maladera nomurai Hirasawa, 1991 c g
 Maladera okinawaensis Kobayashi, 1978 c g
 Maladera okinoerabuana Kobayashi, 1978 c g
 Maladera ollivieri Keith, 1998 c g
 Maladera omanica (Ahrens, 2000) c g
 Maladera opaca (Moser, 1924) c g
 Maladera opacifrons (Fairmaire, 1891) c g
 Maladera opima Nomura, 1967 c g
 Maladera orientalis (Motschulsky, 1857) c g
 Maladera oshimana Nomura, 1962 c g
 Maladera ostentatrix (Brenske, 1899) c g
 Maladera ovatula (Fairmaire, 1891) c g
 Maladera padaviyaensis Ahrens & Fabrizi, 2016 c g
 Maladera palona (Brenske, 1898) c g
 Maladera paraprabangana Ahrens & Fabrizi, 2016 c g
 Maladera paraquinquidens Ahrens, 2004 c g
 Maladera paris Ahrens, 2004 c g
 Maladera parva (Moser, 1908) c g
 Maladera pauper Ahrens & Fabrizi, 2016 c g
 Maladera peguana (Brenske, 1898) c g
 Maladera perniciosa (Brenske, 1898) c g
 Maladera philippinensis (Blanchard, 1850) c g
 Maladera philippinica (Brenske, 1894) c
 Maladera phoenicica (Petrovitz, 1969) c g
 Maladera phuntsholingensis Ahrens, 2004 c g
 Maladera placida (Frey, 1972) c g
 Maladera pokharae Ahrens, 2004 c g
 Maladera polunini Ahrens, 2004 c g
 Maladera poonensis (Khan & Ghai, 1980) c g
 Maladera poonmudi (Frey, 1975) c g
 Maladera poyagana Fabrizi & Ahrens, 2014 c g
 Maladera prabangana (Brenske, 1899) c g
 Maladera praviforceps Ahrens & Fabrizi, 2016 c g
 Maladera prenai Ahrens, 2004 c g
 Maladera profana Ahrens & Fabrizi, 2016 c g
 Maladera propagator Ahrens & Fabrizi, 2016 c g
 Maladera proxima (Burmeister, 1855) c
 Maladera pseudohongkongica Ahrens & Fabrizi, 2016 c g
 Maladera pseudomollis Fabrizi & Ahrens, 2014 c g
 Maladera pubescens (Arrow, 1916) c
 Maladera punctatissima (Faldermann, 1835) c g
 Maladera punctulata (Frey, 1972) c g
 Maladera quinquidens (Brenske, 1896) c g
 Maladera raptiensis Ahrens, 2004 c g
 Maladera reichenowi (Brenske, 1902) c g
 Maladera renardi (Ballion, 1870) c g
 Maladera rolciki Ahrens, 2004 c g
 Maladera romanoi Fabrizi & Ahrens, 2014 c g
 Maladera rosettae (Frey, 1972) c
 Maladera rotunda (Arrow, 1946) c g
 Maladera rotundata (Walker, 1859) c g
 Maladera rubida (Moser, 1915) c g
 Maladera rudimentalis Ahrens & Fabrizi, 2016 c g
 Maladera rudis (Brenske, 1899) c g
 Maladera rufescens (Nonfried, 1894) c g
 Maladera ruficollis (Brenske, 1898) c g
 Maladera rufocuprea (Blanchard, 1850) c g
 Maladera rufoplagiata (Fairmaire, 1893) c g
 Maladera rufotestacea (Moser, 1915) c g
 Maladera rustica (Brenske, 1896) c g
 Maladera saginata (Brenske, 1898) c g
 Maladera sagittula Ahrens & Fabrizi, 2016 c g
 Maladera saitoi (Niijima & Kinoshita, 1927) c g
 Maladera sancta (Brenske, 1899) c g
 Maladera sapitana (Moser, 1916) c g
 Maladera satoi Nomura, 1961 c g
 Maladera satrapa (Brenske, 1898) c g
 Maladera sauteri (Moser, 1918) c
 Maladera schenklingi (Moser, 1918) c g
 Maladera schereri (Frey, 1975) c
 Maladera schintlmeisteri Fabrizi & Ahrens, 2014 c g
 Maladera schnitteri Ahrens, Fabrizi & Rössner, 2016 c g
 Maladera schoenfeldti (Murayama, 1937) c g
 Maladera schoenwitzae Ahrens & Fabrizi, 2016 c g
 Maladera secrata  g
 Maladera secreta (Brenske, 1897) c g
 Maladera sedula Ahrens & Fabrizi, 2016 c g
 Maladera seleuciensis (Petrovitz, 1969) c g
 Maladera sempiterna (Brenske, 1898) c g
 Maladera sempiternella Ahrens & Fabrizi, 2016 c g
 Maladera senfti Ahrens & Fabrizi, 2016 c g
 Maladera senta (Brenske, 1897) c g
 Maladera seriatoguttata Ahrens & Fabrizi, 2016 c g
 Maladera sericella (Brenske, 1898) c g
 Maladera servitrita (Brenske, 1898) c g
 Maladera setosa (Brenske, 1896) c
 Maladera setosiventris (Moser, 1916) c g
 Maladera severini (Brenske, 1896) c
 Maladera shihzitouensis Kobayashi, 2002 c g
 Maladera shimogana Ahrens & Fabrizi, 2016 c g
 Maladera shiva Ahrens & Fabrizi, 2016 c g
 Maladera shouchiana Kobayashi & Yu, 1997 c g
 Maladera siamensis (Nonfried, 1891) c
 Maladera siargaoensis (Moser, 1922) c g
 Maladera signatitarsis (Brenske, 1898) c g
 Maladera significabilis (Brenske, 1902) c g
 Maladera significans (Brenske, 1898) c g
 Maladera sikkimensis (Brenske, 1898) c g
 Maladera simlana (Brenske, 1898) c g
 Maladera sinaica Ahrens, 2000 c g
 Maladera sincera (Brenske, 1898) c
 Maladera siniaevi Ahrens, 2004 c g
 Maladera sinica (Hope, 1845) c g
 Maladera sinistra (Brenske, 1898) c g
 Maladera sinuosa (Brenske, 1898) c g
 Maladera siwalikiana Ahrens, 2004 c g
 Maladera slateri Ahrens & Fabrizi, 2016 c g
 Maladera solida (Brenske, 1898) c g
 Maladera songsakensis Ahrens & Fabrizi, 2016 c g
 Maladera sontica (Brenske, 1898) c g
 Maladera sordida (Brenske, 1898) c g
 Maladera sparsesetosa (Moser, 1922) c g
 Maladera spatulata Ahrens, 2006 c g
 Maladera spei Ahrens, 2004 c g
 Maladera spinifemorata Kobayashi, 1993 c g
 Maladera spinifera (Brenske, 1898) c g
 Maladera spinitibilais Statz, 1952 c g
 Maladera spinosa (Brenske, 1899) c g
 Maladera spiralis Ahrens, 2003 c g
 Maladera spissa (Brenske, 1899) c g
 Maladera spissigrada (Brenske, 1897) c g
 Maladera sprecherae Ahrens, 2004 c g
 Maladera staturosa (Brenske, 1898) c g
 Maladera stevensi Ahrens, 2004 c g
 Maladera stipidosa (Brenske, 1899) c g
 Maladera stolida (Brenske, 1899) c g
 Maladera straba (Brenske, 1898) c g
 Maladera straminea (Moser, 1915) c g
 Maladera stricta (Brenske, 1899) c g
 Maladera stridula (Brenske, 1897) c g
 Maladera strumina (Brenske, 1899) c g
 Maladera subaana (Moser, 1922) c g
 Maladera subabbreviata Ahrens & Fabrizi, 2016 c g
 Maladera submucronata Ahrens & Fabrizi, 2016 c g
 Maladera subspinosa (Brenske, 1898) c g
 Maladera subtruncata (Fairmaire, 1887) c g
 Maladera sumbana (Moser, 1915) c g
 Maladera sumbawana (Brenske, 1899) c g
 Maladera sunaiensis Ahrens & Fabrizi, 2016 c g
 Maladera sylhetensis Ahrens & Fabrizi, 2016 c g
 Maladera syriaca (Petrovitz, 1969) c g
 Maladera taienhsiangensis Kobayashi, 2007b g
 Maladera taiheii Kobayashi, 2016 c g
 Maladera taiwana Nomura, 1974 c g
 Maladera taiyal Kobayashi, 2002 c g
 Maladera taoyuanensis Kobayashi, 1991 c g
 Maladera taurica (Petrovitz, 1969) c
 Maladera teinzoana (Brenske, 1898) c g
 Maladera tempestiva Ahrens & Fabrizi, 2016 c g
 Maladera theresae Ahrens & Fabrizi, 2016 c g
 Maladera thomsoni (Brenske, 1894) c g
 Maladera tibialis (Brenske, 1898) c g
 Maladera tiefermanni Ahrens & Fabrizi, 2016 c g
 Maladera tienchihna Kobayashi, 1988 c g
 Maladera tokunoshimana Kobayashi, Kusui & Imasaka, 2006 c g
 Maladera tomentosa (Frey, 1972) c
 Maladera tranquebarica (Brenske, 1898) c g
 Maladera trichotibialis Ahrens, 2004 c g
 Maladera tricuspidata Fabrizi & Ahrens, 2014 c g
 Maladera tridentata (Moser, 1918) c
 Maladera tridenticeps (Moser, 1915) c g
 Maladera tridentipes Nomura, 1974 c g
 Maladera trilobata (Khan & Ghai, 1980) c g
 Maladera trivandrumensis Ahrens & Fabrizi, 2016 c g
 Maladera trochaloides Ahrens & Fabrizi, 2016 c g
 Maladera tsienhsiangensis Kobayashi, 2007 c g
 Maladera tubulata Ahrens & Fabrizi, 2016 c g
 Maladera tumida Ahrens, 2004 c g
 Maladera tyrannica (Brenske, 1894) c g
 Maladera uggalkaltotaensis Fabrizi & Ahrens, 2014 c g
 Maladera uhligi Ahrens, 2004 c g
 Maladera ukerewensis (Moser, 1917) c
 Maladera umbilicata (Brenske, 1898) c g
 Maladera umbratica (Brenske, 1898) c g
 Maladera unguicularis (Brenske, 1898) c g
 Maladera utacamanda (Brenske, 1898) c g
 Maladera varia (Brenske, 1898) c g
 Maladera ventralis (Brenske, 1897) c g
 Maladera ventriosa (Brenske, 1894) c g
 Maladera vernacula Ahrens & Fabrizi, 2016 c g
 Maladera versuta Ahrens & Fabrizi, 2016 c g
 Maladera verticalis (Fairmaire, 1888) c g
 Maladera vignai Sabatinelli, 1977 c g
 Maladera vulpecula (Arrow, 1946) c g
 Maladera watanabei Kobayashi, 2002 c g
 Maladera weigeli Ahrens, 2004 c g
 Maladera weligamana (Brenske, 1900) c g
 Maladera westermanni (Brenske, 1898) c g
 Maladera wewalkai (Petrovitz, 1969) c g
 Maladera wolfgangdierli Ahrens, 2004 c g
 Maladera woodi Fabrizi & Ahrens, 2014 c g
 Maladera xanthoptera Ahrens & Fabrizi, 2016 c g
 Maladera yaeyamana Nomura, 1963 c g
 Maladera yakushimana Kobayashi, Kusui & Imasaka, 2006 c g
 Maladera yalaensis Fabrizi & Ahrens, 2014 c g
 Maladera yasutoshii Nomura, 1974 c g
 Maladera zeta (Von Dalle Torre, 1912) c g

Data sources: i = ITIS, c = Catalogue of Life, g = GBIF, b = Bugguide.net

References

Maladera